Duan Jingzhu is a fictional character in Water Margin, one of the Four Great Classical Novels of Chinese literature. Nicknamed "Golden Haired Hound", he ranks 108th among the 108 Stars of Destiny and 72nd among the 72 Earthly Fiends.

Background
The novel depicts Duan Jingzhu as having red hair and a yellow beard, which earns him the nickname "Golden Haired Dog".  A native of Zhuozhou, he rustles horses for a living on the northern frontier of the Song Empire.

Joining Liangshan
One day Duan Jingzhu steals a precious swift steed called "Jade Lion" which belongs to a Jurchen prince. He intends to present it to Song Jiang, then the second-in-command of Liangshan Marsh, as his ticket to join the band. But on the way, he is intercepted by men from the Zeng Family Fortress, who snatch away the horse. They also mock Liangshan when he tells them the horse is meant for the stronghold.

Duan Jingzhu darts out to kneel before Song Jiang when the latter is riding back to Liangshan with his men after a battle at Mount Mangdang with Fan Rui. Impressed with Duan's looks, Song accepts him into his band. When Duan recounts the insults of the Zeng Family Fortress, Chao Gai, the chief of Liangshan, is mad with rage and decides to personally lead a force to attack the Zengs. For the first time Chao commands a military expedition of Liangshan in place of Song Jiang. However, the attack ends in disaster as Chao is shot dead by Shi Wengong, the martial arts instructor of the fortress. After some distractions, the outlaws eventually turn their attention to the Zeng Family Fortress. They capture Shi and avenge Chao's death.

Campaigns and death
Duan Jingzhu is appointed as one of the scout leaders of Liangshan after the 108 Stars of Destiny came together in what is called the Grand Assembly. He participates in the campaigns against the Liao invaders and rebel forces in Song territory following amnesty from Emperor Huizong for Liangshan.

In the attack on the Qiantang River in the campaign against Fang La, Duan Jingzhu, who is in the squad of Ruan Xiaoqi and a non-swimmer, drowns when his boat overturns after being swept into the open sea by strong winds.

References
 
 
 
 
 
 
 

72 Earthly Fiends
Fictional characters from Hebei